Charlie Mel Barker (born 12 February 2003) is an English footballer who plays as a defender for Wealdstone on loan from Charlton Athletic.

Career

Charlton Athletic
Barker made his senior debut for Charlton on 1 September 2020 in a 2–1 EFL Trophy defeat to AFC Wimbledon. In response to Barker's senior Charlton debut, manager Lee Bowyer said "I thought young Barker was outstanding, outstanding. He didn’t put a foot wrong all night, in possession and out of possession".

In his second senior appearance, an EFL Cup tie against Swindon Town, he scored his first senior goal as his side won 3–1.

Wealdstone (loan)
On 24 September 2021, Barker joined non-league Wealdstone on a month's youth loan. He made his debut in a 1–0 away win against Kings Lynn Town, and would go on to make three appearances for the club.

Hemel Hempstead Town (loan)
On 1 September 2022, Barker joined Hemel Hempstead Town on loan until 1 January 2023.

On 28 October 2022, it was announced that Barker had been recalled early by Charlton Athletic.

Wealdstone (second loan)
On the same day Barker was recalled from Hemel Hempstead Town, he made the switch back to Wealdstone until 1 January 2023. On 3 January 2023, the loan was extended until the end of the 2022–23 season.

Personal life
He is the son of former professional footballer and manager Richie Barker.

Career statistics

References

External links
 
 

2003 births
Living people
English footballers
Association football defenders
Charlton Athletic F.C. players
Wealdstone F.C. players
Hemel Hempstead Town F.C. players
English Football League players
National League (English football) players